Santiago Municipal Airport was a both passenger and military airport located in the Center of Santiago de los Caballeros, Dominican Republic. This airport served this city with daily flights to San Juan in Puerto Rico, Port-au-Prince in Haiti, Santiago de Cuba, Miami and others. It was the major hub of Dominair, who had based two Dash 8 here. It was also used as a secondary hub by the FAD.

History
This airport was built in the 1930s, during Trujillo's government, with the major purpose of stimulating the city's growth.

The operations were focused on passenger movements between San Juan and Santiago, and also cargo operations to San Juan, Santo Domingo and Port-au-Prince.

Before ceasing operations, Dominicana de Aviación became the first airline to connect Santiago with the United States, starting operations between Santiago and Miami, in  McDonnell Douglas DC-6 aircraft in the 1970s.

In the 1990s, another Dominican airline, Dominair, started operations in the airport, with two daily flights to San Juan. They added flights to Port-au-Prince three years later.

In 1998 the airport had its biggest expansion ever. They enlarged the runway to support operation of the American Eagle's ATR aircraft. The airport remained closed for at least eight months.

In 1999 American Eagle started, for the first time, operations in Santiago, adding two daily flights to San Juan, making Dominair to leave the route.

In 2002 the airport closed its doors to the public due to the inauguration of a bigger airport, Cibao International Airport, located 15 minutes away from the city center. This new airport allowed jet-passenger aircraft operations and could receive flights from New York, Miami and San Juan, which Santiago Municipal Airport could not handle.

On March 18, 2002, the two American Eagle flights to San Juan were transferred to the new Cibao International Airport, ceasing passenger operations in Santiago Municipal Airport. A Year later the Santiago Air Base became unnecessary for the FAD, and a cost that they could not handle by themselves, so they moved all operations to the Puerto Plata Air Base (located in Gregorio Luperon International Airport). Santiago Municipal was now completely closed, with no operations at all.

Santiago Municipal Airport is now known as Cibao Center National Police, north command of operations for the National Police.

Former airlines and destinations

American Airlines
American Eagle (San Juan)
Dominicana de Aviación (Miami, Santo Domingo)
Dominair (Port-au-Prince, San Juan, Santo Domingo)

Dominican Air Force operations

Santiago Municipal Airport was the secondary hub for the Dominican Air Force. They had at least 30% of their operations in this airport. They also had their own ramp and terminal, located behind the hangars of the Civil Aviation, next to the control tower.

All the military operations to the northwest of the country were originated from Santiago Municipal, which people also referred to as Santiago Air Base, pointing the Military Terminal.

Post-closure
The Central Park of Santiago is projected to be constructed on the land of the now defunct old Santiago Municipal Airport that now lodges the regional seat of the National Police and the offices of the Association for Development. The industrialists of Santiago have defended the project since it is considered to be a solution to the lack of green spaces suitable for relaxation in the city. Nevertheless, it has been argued that the granting of contracts for the different phases from this project violate the frame of transparency and legality. In the Strategic Plan of Santiago it is indicated that the construction of the Metropolitan Park would increase the Santiagos green area from its current 1.1% to 4%.

While the old military side of the airport is now used for the National Police, the old passenger terminal side is now used as a racetrack.

External links
FAD3069 Bell 205
Bell 205
FAD3069
Santiago Municipal Airport

Defunct airports
Airports in the Dominican Republic